El Caballito, officially Cabeza de caballo ("horse's head"), is an outdoor  tall steel sculpture by Sebastián (Enrique Carbajal) depicting a horse's head, installed along Mexico City's Paseo de la Reforma, in Mexico. It was dedicated on January 15, 1992.

Enrique Carbajal (Sebastian) created the El Caballito monument under the Olmec conception. The El Caballito was installed in front of the Torre del Caballito, a high office building. The monument had to replace the statue of Carlos IV which was removed from there in 1979, and also had to be some kind of chimney that would dissipate the vapors from deep drainage but wouldn't adversely affect the image of the Paseo de la Reforma.

See also 

 Glorieta del Caballito

References

External links

 

1992 establishments in Mexico
1992 sculptures
Animal sculptures in Mexico
Horses in art
Outdoor sculptures in Mexico City
Paseo de la Reforma
Steel sculptures in Mexico